Events from the year 1870 in Denmark.

Incumbents
 Monarch – Christian IX
 Prime minister – C. E. Frijs (until 28 May), Ludvig Holstein-Holsteinborg

Events
 17 May – The turreted ironclad Gorm is launched from the Naval Dockyard in Copenhagen.
 28 May – Prime Minister C. E. Frijs resigns, and is replaced by Ludvig Holstein-Holsteinborg.
 26 September – Prince Christian, the future King Christian X, is born to Crown Prince Frederick and Crown Princess Louise.
 September/October – The literary fairy tale "The Most Incredible Thing", by poet and author Hans Christian Andersen, is published in the United States and Denmark.
 4 October – The railway line Lille Syd, between Roskilde and Næstved by way of Køge, is opened.
 2 November – The Vestre Cemetery in Copenhagen is opened.

Date unknown
 The Hansen Writing Ball is first patented and entered into production.
 Rosenfeldt Manor, just west of Vordingborg, is completed.
 Sundby Church in Copenhagen is completed.
 The political party Venstre is founded.

Births
 7 January – Anna Syberg, painter, one of the "Funen Painters" (died 1914)
 15 January – Johan Peter Koch, captain and arctic explorer (died 1928)
 18 February 
 August Busck, Danish-American entomologist and author of works on microlepidoptera (died 1944)
 Thorvald Madsen, physician and bacteriologist (died 1957)
 9 April
 Arild Rosenkrantz, nobleman, painter, sculptor, stained-glass artist and illustrator (died 1964)
 Albrecht Schmidt, film actor (died 1945)
 24 July – Holger Damgaard, Denmark's first press photographer (died 1945)
 25 July – Peter Rochegune Munch, historian and politician, served in three governments between 1909 and 1940 (died 1948)
 28 July – Michael Agerskov, spiritualist teacher and author (died 1933)
 3 August – Peter Jörgensen, entomologist and teacher, active in Argentina and Paraguay (died 1937)
 26 September – Prince Christian, the future King Christian X (died 1947)
 16 October – Helge Rode, writer, critic and journalist (died 1937)
 25 November – Petrine Sonne, stage and film actress (died 1946)
 18 December – Anders Randolf, Danish-American actor during the silent film era (died 1930)

Deaths
 27 January – Johannes Flintoe, painter of landscapes and scenes from Scandinavian history (born 1787)
 25 February – Henrik Hertz, poet during the Danish Golden Age (born 1797)
 6 April – Christen Mikkelsen Kold, teacher who founded a school in Ryslinge, which later became a model for the Danish folk high-school system (born 1816)
 13 April – Mathias Lüttichau, Danish Minister of War (born 1795)
 29 April – Niels Laurits Høyen, art historian (Denmark's first) and critic (born 1798)
 29 May – Emil Horneman, composer and art and music tradesman (born 1809)
 13 July – Christian Albrecht Jensen, portrait painter during the Danish Golden Age (born 1792)
 28 August – Søren Hjorth, railway pioneer and inventor (born 1801)
 13 September – Orla Lehmann, statesman and key figure in the development of Denmark's parliamentary government (born 1810)
 14 November – Henrik Nikolai Krøyer, zoologist and zoology teacher and textbook author (born 1799)
 30 November – Poul Pagh, merchant and shipowner (born 1796)
 5 December  Herman Severin Løvenskiold /born 1815)

References

External links

 
Denmark
1870s in Denmark
Years of the 19th century in Denmark